Chenzhuang is a town of Lingshou County in western Hebei province, China, located in the Taihang Mountains  northwest of the county seat and served by China National Highway 207. , it has 36 villages under its administration.

Chenzhuang is the site of a partially built amusement park called "Wonderland", whose construction was abandoned in 1998. The aim of the developers was to build the largest amusement park in Asia, but they ran into disagreements with the local government and the farmers over land prices. An attempt to restart the construction in 2008 proved unsuccessful.

See also
List of township-level divisions of Hebei

References

Township-level divisions of Hebei